Dark Detectives: Adventures of the Supernatural Sleuths is an anthology of fantasy and horror detective stories edited by Stephen Jones.  It was published by F & B Mystery in 1999 in an edition of 2,100 copies of which 100 were signed by all the contributors except R. Chetwynd-Hayes.  The anthology contains 10 stories and a novel, Seven Stars, whose episodes are interspersed among the stories.  Several of the stories first appeared in collections, or in the magazines The Idler, Kadath and Time Out.

Contents
 "Introduction: The Serial Sleuths", by Stephen Jones
 "Seven Stars Prologue: In Egypt’s Land", by Kim Newman
 "Our Lady of Death", by Peter Tremayne
 "Seven Stars Episode One: The Mummy’s Heart", by Kim Newman
 "The Horse of the Invisible", by William Hope Hodgson
 "Seven Stars Episode Two: The Magician and the Matinee Idol", by Kim Newman
 "The Adventure of the Crawling Horror", by Basil Copper
 "Seven Stars Episode Three: The Trouble with Barrymore", by Kim Newman
 "Rouse Him Not", by Manly Wade Wellman
 "De Marigny’s Clock", by Brian Lumley
 "Seven Stars Episode Four: The Biafran Bank Manager", by Kim Newman
 "Someone Is Dead", by R. Chetwynd-Hayes
 "Vultures Gather", by Brian Mooney
 "Lost Souls", by Clive Barker
 "Seven Stars Episode Five: Mimsy", by Kim Newman
 "The Man Who Shot the Man Who Shot The Man Who Shot Liberty Valence", by Jay Russell
 "Seven Stars Episode Six: The Dog Story", by Kim Newman
 "Bay Wolf", by Neil Gaiman
 "Seven Stars Episode Seven: The Duel of Seven Stars", by Kim Newman

References

Notes

1999 anthologies
Fantasy anthologies
Horror anthologies
Mystery anthologies
Occult detective fiction
Fedogan & Bremer books